Euphaedra sarcoptera, the large true forester, is a butterfly in the family Nymphalidae. It is found in Guinea, Sierra Leone, Ivory Coast, Ghana, Togo, Benin, Nigeria, Cameroon, the Central African Republic, the Democratic Republic of the Congo and Tanzania.

Description
 
E. sarcoptera Btlr. has like aurata a broad yellow subapical band on the upperside of the forewing, but differs from both the other forms [of Euphaedra cyparissa] in the presence of a bright red spot at the base of the forewing beneath; this spot is placed in the cell and reaches about to its middle. Ashanti and Dahomey.

Biology
The habitat consists of lowland forests.

It is thought to be a co-mimic of Charaxes fournierae jolybouyeri.

The larvae feed on Dennetia tripetala.

Subspecies
E. s. sarcoptera (Guinea, Sierra Leone, Ivory Coast, Ghana, Togo, Benin, Nigeria)
E. s. cyparissoides Hecq, 1979 (Cameroon, Central African Republic, western Democratic Republic of the Congo)
E. s. ferrea Pyrcz & Warren-Gash, 2013 (Guinea: Mount Nimba)
E. s. nipponicorum (Carcasson, 1965) (Democratic Republic of the Congo, north-western Tanzania)
E. s. styx Larsen & Warren-Gash, 2003 (Ivory Coast)

Gallery

References

Butterflies described in 1871
sarcoptera
Butterflies of Africa
Taxa named by Arthur Gardiner Butler